Dhanmondi Government Boys' High School (DGBHS) is a public boys' school located in Dhanmondi, Dhaka, Bangladesh. It is a state run educational institution located at the intersection of Mirpur Road and Manik Miah Avenue. It's EIIN: 107960.

Daily assembly
Assembly is called every day before schooling. Students telawaat Sura Fatiha, oath and sing the national song of Bangladesh.

Uniform
From classes 1 to 3 the school uniform is a white shirt with navy blue shorts, white shoes and navy blue sweater (for winter only). From classes 4 to 10 the uniform is a white shirt with full-length navy blue pants, white shoes and navy blue sweater (for winter only). The school's monogram is printed on the shirt's pocket.

Exam system and results
There are two terms in a year. The first is the "half-yearly" term (January – June), and the second is the "annual" term (July – December). Two class tests are taken before both half yearly and annual examination.
Students get their results digitally printed. The final result is announced taking 40% numbers from 'Half-yearly' term and 40% number from 'Annual' Term and 20% number from class test examinations. For classes 5, 8, and 10, students sit for a "test exam" instead of an "annual exam."

Teachers-guardians conference
Teacher-guardian conferences are called periodically.

Library
The books in the library were largely bought by coeval sanctioned money during the establishment of the school. Others were bought by annually approved money. For the reason of Enam Committee the post 'librarian' was discontinued but now it is running under a teacher of this school.

School magazine
The name of the school magazine is ANKUR. The magazine was last published in 2018.

Students' association
The former students of DGBHS are known as DExSAn (sometimes referred to Dboys), a phrase initially proposed by Dboys' Ex-Students Association (DExSA) just before its wider acceptance. DExSA, however, is the alumni association of the institution.

Extracurricular sports
The annual sports competition is organised by the school authority in February each year and includes sprints (100 to 400 meters), long jump, and high jump.

Clubs and societies 
 Dhanmondi Govt. Boys' High School Scouts Group
 Dhanmondi Govt Boys Debating Society
 DGBHS Bangladesh National Cadet Core
 DGBHS Youth Red Crescent Society
 DGBHS Film and Photography Club
 Science Club of DGBHS
 Quizzing Society Of D. Boyzists
 Dhanmondi Govt. Boys' Language and Reading Club

SSC results

Notable alumni 

 Saber Hossain Chowdhury
 M. Zahid Hasan
 Tushar Imran
 Fazlur Rahman Khan
 Akbar Ali Khan
 Syed Hasanur Rahman
 Abdus Suttar Khan
 Sharifullah
 Shatabdi Wadud
 Ferdous Wahid 
 Mujibur Rahman Chowdhury
 Sheikh Fazle Noor Taposh
 Afran Nisho

References

External links
 

Dhanmondi
Educational institutions established in 1965
Schools in Dhaka District
1965 establishments in East Pakistan